Good Music may refer to:

 GOOD Music, a management and production company founded by Kanye West
 Good Music 107.5FM, a former radio station in Christchurch, New Zealand
 Good Music (Joan Jett and the Blackhearts album), 1986
 Good Music (Murs album), 1999
 Easy listening, an alternative name